Brenda Novak (born in 1964 in Vernal, Utah) is an American author of historical romance, contemporary romance, and romantic suspense. She has authored over 50 books.

Bibliography

Whiskey Creek
 Discovering You, 5/2016—MIRA Books
 A Winter Wedding, 10/2015—MIRA Books
 This Heart of Mine, 3/2015—MIRA Books
 The Heart of Christmas, 10/2014—MIRA Books
 Come Home To Me, 3/2014—MIRA Books
 Take Me Home for Christmas, 10/2013—MIRA Books
 Home to Whiskey Creek, 7/2013—MIRA Books
 When Summer Comes, 1/2013, MIRA Books
 When Snow Falls, 10/2012—MIRA Books
 When Lightning Strikes, 8/2012—MIRA Books
 When We Touch (prequel novella), 8/2012

Fairham Island
 The Secrets She Kept, 7/2016—MIRA Books
 The Secret Sister, 7/2015—MIRA Books

The Evelyn Talbot Chronicles
Hanover House (prequel novella), 9/2015—Brenda Novak, Inc.
Her Darkest Nightmare, 8/2016—St. Martin's Press
Hello Again, 10/2017—St. Martin's Press
Face Off, 8/2018—St. Martin's Press
Blind Spot, 8/2019—St. Martin's Press

Historical Romance
 A Matter of Grave Concern, 10/2014 - Montlake
 Through The Smoke, 10/2013 - Montlake
 Honor Bound (original title: The Bastard), 11/2011
 Of Noble Birth, 11/99 (HarperCollins), reprint 3/2011

Bulletproof Series
 Inside, 7/2011 - MIRA Books
 In Seconds, 9/2011 - MIRA Books
 In Close, 11/2011 - MIRA Books

Dept. 6 Hired Guns Series
 Killer Heat, 10/2010 – MIRA Books
 Body Heat, 9/2010 – MIRA Books
 White Heat, 8/2010 – MIRA Books

Last Stand Series
 The Perfect Murder, 10/2009 – MIRA Books
 The Perfect Liar, 9/2009 – MIRA Books
 The Perfect Couple, 8/2009 – MIRA Books
 Watch Me, 8/2008 – MIRA Books
 Stop Me, 7/2008 – MIRA Books
 Trust Me, 6/2008 – MIRA Books

Stillwater Series
 Dead Right, 8/2007 – MIRA Books
 Dead Giveaway, 2/2007 – MIRA Books
 Dead Silence, 8/2006 – MIRA Books

Single Title
 Every Waking Moment, 7/2005, Harlequin
 Cold Feet, 2/2005, Harlequin
 Taking the Heat, 2/2004, Harlequin

Harlequin Superromance (Dundee, Idaho Series)
 That One Night (original title: A Baby of Her Own), 9/2002
 A Husband of Her Own, 5/2003
 A Family of Her Own, 4/2004
 A Home of Her Own, 12/2004
 Stranger In Town, 6/2005
 Big Girls Don't Cry, 9/2005
 The Other Woman, 5/2006
 Coulda Been a Cowboy, 6/2007
 That Christmas Feeling, 11/2010

Harlequin Superromance (Silver Springs Series)
 Finding Our Forever, 4/2017
 No One But You, 6/2017
 Until You Loved Me, 8/2017
 Right Where We Belong, 11/2017
 Unforgettable You, 2/2019
 Christmas in Silver Springs, 10/2019
 A California Christmas, expected in 9/2020

Harlequin Superromance
 Sanctuary
 Shooting the Moon
 We Saw Mommy Kissing Santa Claus
 Dear Maggie
 Baby Business
 Snow Baby
 Expectations

Anthologies in collaboration
 Love Is Murder, 2/2013 (With Allison Brennan, Sherrilyn Kenyon, Heather Graham, Lee Child and Edited by Sandra Brown)
 More Than Words, 2/2012 (with Debbie Macomber and Meryl Sawyer)
 Once Upon a Christmas, 10/2011 (with Melinda Curtis and Anna Adams)
 That Christmas Feeling, 11/2010 (with Kathleen O'Brien and Karina Bliss)
 The Night Before Christmas, 11/2009 (with Day LeClaire and Molly O'Keefe)
 Mother, Please! (2004) (with Alison Kent and Jill Shalvis)
 More Than Words (2004) (with Susan Mallery, Diana Palmer, Carla Neggers, and Emilie Richards)
 Family of Her Own / Brother Quest (2004) (with Lori Handeland)
 Omnibus : Snow Angels (2004) (with B. J. Daniels)
 Baby Jane / We Saw Mummy Kissing Santa Claus / Wide Open Spaces (2004) (with Roz Denny Fox and Judith Arnold)
 Sanctuary, 12/2003 (with Pamela Bauer, Judith Bowen, K.N. Casper,  Laura Abbot and Caron Todd)

References

External links
 Official website

20th-century American novelists
21st-century American novelists
American women novelists
American romantic fiction writers
American crime fiction writers
Novelists from Utah
Living people
1964 births
Women romantic fiction writers
20th-century American women writers
21st-century American women writers
Women crime fiction writers